Mark Cagaanan Aguhar (May 16, 1987 – March 12, 2012) was an American activist, writer and multimedia fine artist known for her multidisciplinary work about gender, beauty and existing as a racial minority, while being body positive and transgender femme-identified. Aguhar was made famous by her Tumblr blog that questioned the mainstream representation of the "glossy glorification of the gay white male body".

Life 
Aguhar was born May 16, 1987 in Houston, Texas in a Filipino American family. She attended the University of Texas at Austin. Aguhar's works include performance-based pieces, watercolors, collages, and photography. Often the work was of self-portraits with hair extensions, make-up, gender-specific clothing and a beautiful, unashamed portrait of herself, curves and all and reminds the viewer that Aguhar's life and mere existence was an act of confronting white hegemony.

Aguhar maintained an online presence on Tumblr, which hosted both her professional and personal websites. As Tumblr user "calloutqueen," she titled her blog "BLOGGING FOR BROWN GURLS," posting her thoughts about sexuality, sex, dating, gender, and her work.

Aguhar was only a few months away from earning her MFA degree from University of Illinois at Chicago (UIC) when she died by suicide in Chicago, Illinois, on March 12, 2012.

Legacy 
Since 2012, there is a "Mark Aguhar Memorial Grant" available through Chances Dances for queer artists of color.

In 2013, artist Edie Fake had the exhibition titled, "Memory Palaces" in Chicago and paid tribute to five artists and friends that had died, one of which was Mark Aguhar.

The 2015–2016 exhibition, Bring Your Own Body: Transgender between archives and aesthetics, started the tour at Cooper Union and was created in order to explore the meaning of trans and what defines transgender aesthetic in many different forms of artwork. Other transgender artists and archivists participating in this exhibition included: Niv Acosta, Math Bass, Justin Vivian Bond, Pauline Boudry / Renate Lorenz, Vaginal Davis, Zackary Drucker, Chloe Dzubilo, Tourmaline with Sasha Wortzel, Juliana Huxtable, Greer Lankton, Pierre Molinier, Genesis Breyer P-Orridge, Flawless Sabrina, Buzz Slutzky, and Chris Vargas with the Museum of Transgender Hirstory and Art.

Her poem "Litanies to My Heavenly Brown Body" was widely circulated after the 2016 Orlando nightclub shooting.

In the publication "Proximity: On the Work of Mark Aguhar," (2015), writer Roy Pérez examines Aguhar's drawings, videos, live acts, and writings as performances of closeness, and as critiques of racism, transphobia, and fat phobia. Pérez highlights the complexity of Aguhar's queerness and "not wanting to form attachments within the dominant normative society".

Select exhibitions 

 2009: No Lone Zone, Creative Research Lab, Austin, Texas
 2009: New American Talent, The Twenty-fourth Exhibition, Arthouse at the Jones Center, Contemporary Art for Texas, Austin, Texas
 2010: Ideas of Mountains, Creative Research Laboratory, Austin, Texas
 2010: Boiz Club, Box13 ArtSpace, Houston, Texas
 2011: M4M, Lawndale Art Center, Houston, Texas
 2012: Torch Song, Gallery 400, University of Illinois at Chicago (UIC), Chicago, Illinois
 2012: The Dragon is the Frame Performances, Gallery 400, University of Illinois at Chicago (UIC), Chicago, Illinois
2015: Bring Your Own Body: Transgender between archives and aesthetics,  41 Cooper Gallery, The Cooper Union, New York City, New York
 2016: Bring Your Own Body: Transgender between archives and aesthetics, Glass Curtain Gallery, Columbia College Chicago, Chicago, Illinois
2016: Bring Your Own Body: Transgender between archives and aesthetics, Cantor Fitzgerald Gallery, Haverford College, Haverford, Pennsylvania
2019: "Nobody Promised You Tomorrow": Art 50 Years After Stonewall, Brooklyn Museum, Brooklyn, New York

References

External links
 Mark Aguhar's portfolio on Tumblr
 In memoriam: Mark Aguhar, 1987–2012 in TimeOut Chicago
 Mark Aguhar, 1987–2012 Obituary in The Awl
 Essay on Hyperallergic
 Mark Aguhar's Critical Flippancy on Bully Bloggers

Artists from Houston
University of Texas at Austin College of Fine Arts alumni
University of Illinois Chicago alumni
Transgender artists
American LGBT artists
American LGBT rights activists
American Internet celebrities
1987 births
2012 deaths
Activists from Houston
Queer artists
American artists of Filipino descent